Allan Sobocinski (born 12 December 1931) is a Brazilian former sports shooter. He competed in the 25 m pistol event at the 1948 Summer Olympics. He placed 56th.

References

External links
 

1931 births
Living people
Brazilian male sport shooters
Olympic shooters of Brazil
Shooters at the 1948 Summer Olympics
Place of birth missing (living people)
Pan American Games medalists in shooting
Pan American Games silver medalists for Brazil
Pan American Games bronze medalists for Brazil
Shooters at the 1951 Pan American Games
Medalists at the 1951 Pan American Games
20th-century Brazilian people
21st-century Brazilian people